Edward "Ed or Lefty" Thomas High (October 26, 1873 – February 10, 1926) was an American professional baseball player who played in four games for the Detroit Tigers during the  season.
He was born in Baltimore, Maryland and died there at the age of 52.

External links

Major League Baseball pitchers
Baseball players from Baltimore
Detroit Tigers players
1873 births
1926 deaths
Hampton Crabs players
New Orleans Pelicans (baseball) players
Newport News Shipbuilders players
Norfolk Skippers players